This is the seventh studio album by the band The Motels, recorded with current touring band whom Martha Davis has been working with for a few years.  When Matthew Morgan, a producer-engineer from Portland met up with The Motels, the resulting work became the new album, This.

Track listing

Personnel 

The Motels
Martha Davis – vocals, guitar
Clint Walsh – guitars, vocals, synthesizer
Jon Siebels – bass guitar
Nick Johns – keyboard
Eric Gardner – drums, percussion
Rusty Logsdon – upright bass on "Sleep"
Dave Siebels – Hammond B3 organ on "Day the Earth Died"

Production
Recorded by Matt Morgan & Jon Siebels
Mixed by Jon Siebels at Clifton Studios
Mastered by Mark Chalecki

References

2008 albums
The Motels albums